Jean-Christophe Colard (born 29 August 1980) is a French professional footballer who plays as a goalkeeper for Championnat National 2 club Moulins Yzeure.

External links
 

1980 births
Living people
People from Vitry-le-François
Sportspeople from Marne (department)
Association football goalkeepers
French footballers
Ligue 2 players
Championnat National 2 players
LB Châteauroux players
SO Châtellerault players
Moulins Yzeure Foot players
ESA Brive players
Footballers from Grand Est